Raymunida is a genus of squat lobsters in the family Munididae, containing the following 11 species:
 Raymunida bellior (Miyake & Baba, 1967)
 Raymunida cagnetei Macpherson & Machordom, 2000
 Raymunida confundens Macpherson & Machordom, 2001
 Raymunida dextralis Macpherson & Machordom, 2001
 Raymunida elegantissima (De Man, 1902)
 Raymunida erythrina Macpherson & Machordom, 2001
 Raymunida formosanus Lin, Chan & Chu, 2004
 Raymunida insulata Macpherson & Machordom, 2001
 Raymunida limbata Macpherson, 2006
 Raymunida lineata Osawa, 2005
 Raymunida vittata Macpherson, 2009

References

External links

Squat lobsters